This is a list of people who have served as Lord Lieutenant of Gloucestershire. Since 1694, all the Lord Lieutenants have also been Custos Rotulorum of Gloucestershire.

Edmund Brydges, 2nd Baron Chandos 1559–?
Giles Brydges, 3rd Baron Chandos 17 November 1586 – 1 February 1594
William Brydges, 4th Baron Chandos 9 September 1595 – 18 November 1602
Henry Berkeley, 7th Baron Berkeley 13 August 1603 – 20 November 1613
Grey Brydges, 5th Baron Chandos 23 December 1613 – 10 August 1621
William Compton, 1st Earl of Northampton 16 March 1622 – 24 June 1630
Spencer Compton, 2nd Earl of Northampton 17 July 1630 – 1642 jointly with
George Brydges, 6th Baron Chandos 3 August 1641 – 1642
William Fiennes, 1st Viscount Saye and Sele 1642 (Parliamentary)
Interregnum
The Duke of Beaufort 30 July 1660 – 1689
The Earl of Macclesfield 22 March 1689 – 7 January 1694
The Earl of Berkeley 25 May 1694 – 24 September 1710
The Earl of Berkeley 30 November 1710 – 1712
The Duke of Beaufort 6 March 1712 – 24 May 1714
The Earl of Berkeley 21 October 1714 – 17 August 1736
The Earl of Berkeley 21 April 1737 – 9 January 1755
The Lord Ducie 19 February 1755 – 1758
The Lord Chedworth 13 November 1758 – 9 May 1762
The Lord Botetourt 4 June 1762 – 1766
The Earl of Berkeley 5 July 1766 – 8 August 1810
The Duke of Beaufort 15 September 1810 – 2 December 1835
The Lord Segrave 18 December 1835 – 10 October 1857 (created Earl FitzHardinge in 1841)
The Earl of Ducie 13 November 1857 – 1911†
The Earl Beauchamp 17 July 1911 – 1931†
The Duke of Beaufort 6 November 1931 – 5 February 1984†
Martin Gibbs 1984–1992
Sir Henry Elwes 17 February 1992 – 24 October 2010
Dame Janet Trotter 25 October 2010 – 29 October 2018
Edward Gillespie 29 October 2018 –

† Lord Lieutenant of the County of Gloucester, and of the City and County of the City of Gloucester, and of the City and County of the City of Bristol.

Deputy lieutenants
A deputy lieutenant of Gloucestershire is commissioned by the Lord Lieutenant of Gloucestershire. Deputy lieutenants support the work of the lord-lieutenant. There can be several deputy lieutenants at any time, depending on the population of the county. Their appointment does not terminate with the changing of the lord-lieutenant, but they usually retire at age 75.

19th Century
10 March 1831: The Rev. Maurice Fitzgerald Stephens
12 March 1831: Robert Canning, Esq.
24 March 1831: John Lewsley Codrington, Esq.
5 April 1831: John Dela Field Phelps, Esq.

References

External links
Lord Lieutenant of Gloucestershire

Gloucestershire
Politics of Gloucestershire
 
Lord Lieutenant